The Guests may refer to:

Ushpizin, a 2004 Israeli film 
"The Guests" (The Outer Limits), a 1964 episode of The Outer Limits
"The Guests", a song by Leonard Cohen from his 1979 album Recent Songs.